The western screech owl (Megascops kennicottii) is a small owl native to North and Central America, closely related to the eastern screech owl. The scientific name commemorates the American naturalist Robert Kennicott.

Description

Length averages , wingspan , and weight . Females are larger than males and northern populations are notably larger than southern populations. Adults are larger than whiskered screech owls, with larger feet and a more streaked plumage pattern.

There are several morphs: brown Pacific, grey Pacific, Great Plains, Mojave, and Mexican. All have either brown or dark gray plumage with streaking on the underparts. There is no red morph. This brown and gray streaky coloring allows the owl to camouflage with trees and hide from predators.

They have a round head with ear tufts, yellow eyes, and a yellowish bill. Their appearance is quite similar to whiskered and eastern screech owls, so it is best to identify them by their calls. They were previously considered to be the same species as the eastern screech owl.

Call
The primary call is an accelerating series of short whistles at an increasing tempo or a short then long trill falling slightly at end. Other calls: barking and chuckling, similar to the eastern screech owl. They also make a high pitched screech.

The two primary songs for the Western Screen Owl are the bounce and double trill. In a recent study, researchers utilizes sonographic analysis of tape-recorded vocalizations to analyze whether the songs differ in male and females and if so, how accurately could songs be classified by sex. It was discovered that on average, male bounce songs were ~30% lower in frequency than bounce songs of females. However, song duration, note duration, number of notes per bout, and internote duration did not differ. For trill songs, males were also significantly lower in frequency compared to those of females. In addition, female double trill songs had greater internet distances in the leading portion.

Range and habitat
The western screech owl is native to Canada, United States, Mexico, Guatemala, El Salvador, Honduras, Costa Rica, and Nicaragua.
Its habitat includes temperate forests, subtropical and tropical montane forests, shrubland, desert, rural fields, and even suburban parks and gardens.

Breeding
Western screech owls are permanent residents of the northwest region of North and Central America, breeding in open woods or mixed woods at forest edges. When attracting a female, a male brings her food and creates a series of clicking noises. During courtship, the pair preens each other’s feathers and sing duets with each other. Once a male and female become a pair, they produce a clutch of 2-7 eggs. The male delivers food to the female as she broods, and once the eggs hatch, the male continues to provide food which the female feeds to the owlets.  Both mates then protect their owlets by guarding their tree cavity from dangers such as snakes, jays, and crows. The female is inseparable from her young for their first three weeks of life, but afterwards she joins the male in hunting for two weeks until the baby owls are ready to leave the nest.

Nesting 
Rather than living in traditional nests, Western Screech Owls reside in cavities in trees, banks, or cliffs. Of these cavities, the tree species vary. They include, but are not limited to oaks, willows, cottonwoods, and cacti. These cavities are around 1 feet in diameter and up to 1.5 feet deep.

More often than not, these cavities are found by the male owl and were made by natural causes or other species such as woodpeckers. They could nest in these cavities for several years.

The cavities serve not only as shelter, but also as a camouflaging device against potential predators. The height for these nests range from approximately 10 to 30 feet above ground.

Hunting and Prey 
These nocturnal birds wait on perches to swoop down on unsuspecting prey; they may also catch insects in flight. They are active at dawn, night, or near dusk, using their excellent hearing and night vision to locate prey. Their diet consists mainly of small mammals such as mice or rats, birds, and large insects; however they are opportunistic predators, even taking to small trout, scorpions, crayfish and smaller birds. Their diet varies based on the season and where exactly they reside.

Motion-activated cameras have photographed the birds eagerly scavenging a road-kill opossum. They have also been known to hunt Mallard ducks and cottontail rabbits, occasionally. Hatching of their young is synchronized with the spring migration of birds; after migrants pass through screech-owls take fledglings of local birds.

Conservation Status 
Although the Western Screech Owl species is slowly declining in the Pacific northwest, the species is considered “of low conservation concern” due to their nocturnality and general ability to live alongside humans in surrounding trees. Their population is estimated to be 180,000 according to the Avian Conservation Assessment Database Scores. In areas densely populated by people, human noise can be a disturbance to their creation of nest cavities and human devastation of forests negatively impacts their habitat. Climate disasters such as fires and heat waves can endanger their livelihood. Humans have made efforts to provide manmade shelter, such as nest boxes, for Western Screech-Owls. The owls have proven to be receptive to these habitats.

Subspecies
There are 9 recognized subspecies:
Megascops kennicottii aikeni Brewster, 1891
Megascops kennicottii bendirei (Brewster, 1882)
Megascops kennicottii cardonensis (Huey, 1926)
Megascops kennicottii kennicottii (Elliot, 1867)
Megascops kennicottii macfarlanei Brewster, 1891
Megascops kennicottii suttoni (R. T. Moore, 1941)
Megascops kennicottii vinaceus Brewster, 1888
Megascops kennicottii xantusi Brewster, 1902
Megascops kennicottii yumanensis (A. H. Miller & L. Miller, 1951)

Gallery

Notes

References
 National Geographic Field Guide to the Birds of North – America 
Handbook of the Birds of the World Vol 5,  J. del Hoyo, editor. 

western screech owl
Native birds of Western Canada
Native birds of the Western United States
Birds of Mexico
western screech owl
western screech owl
western screech owl

External Resources 

(CC) bird calls of Tecolote occidental, Western Screech-Owl, Western Screech Owl, (Otus kennicotti), (Scops kennicottii), (Otus kennicottii)